Hairul Nizam Hanif (born April 6, 1979) is a retired Malaysian footballer

References

External links

 Kami ada kemampuan hadapi Liga Super - Hairul Nizam
 9 pemain lain setuju wakili semula Pahang bagi Liga Malaysia musim depan
 Southern Tigers to bring back glory days of football

1979 births
Living people
Malaysian footballers
People from Pahang
Malaysian people of Malay descent
Association football midfielders
Malaysia international footballers